First Contact is the debut studio album by Australian electronic pop duo Lastlings and was released on 20 November 2020.

The album was announced in September, alongside an album trailer shot in Japan. In a press statement, the pair said the album was about "moments we experience for the first time", saying "It is about those beautiful moments when we feel love for the first time, a child taking its first steps or travelling to a new destination. It's also about the somber moments in our life where we have lost something or someone for the first time and how we grow and change from these."

The album pays homage to the siblings' Japanese heritage. "No Time" draws inspiration from Kazuo Ishiguro's dystopian novel Never Let Me Go, "Take My Hand" was inspired by their favourite anime, Makoto Shinkai's Your Name and the guitar line in "Out of Touch" was inspired by the piano melody of Joe Hisaishi's "The Wind Forest" from Hayao Miyazaki's My Neighbor Totoro.

Critical reception
Glenn Tozer from BlankGC said "Embedded in Lastlings' music are deep and rhythmic bass lines over beats, orchestrated by Josh, with dreamy treble melodies layered above, delivered by the unique vocal style of Amy who almost whisper-sings, sounding effortless" saying the album has "back-to-back ear worming tracks".

Lisa Kocay from Forbes Magazine said "The 12-track body of work is diverse, transcending from dark-pop meets melodic-tech to ethereal soundscapes, all accompanied by Amy Dowdle's enchanting vocals."

Purple Sneakers said "Exploring the senses and emotions that arise when encountering experiences for the first time, the record delves into fleeting moments of love, disappointment and devastation, optimism, the power of connection and so much more." calling the album "twelve exceptional songs".

Track listing

Personnel
Lastlings
 Amy Dowdle – writing, vocals, production 
 Josh Dowdle – writing, vocals, production

Charts

References

Notes

External links
 

2020 debut albums
Lastlings albums
Liberation Records albums